This is a list of years in Nepal.

20th century

21st century

See also
 Timeline of Nepalese history
 Timeline of Kathmandu

 
Nepal history-related lists
Nepal